Patrick Everard (died 1720) was an Irish Jacobite politician and soldier.

Everard was the son of Richard Everard and Maud Netterville. In 1689, he was elected as a Member of Parliament for Kells in the Patriot Parliament summoned by James II of England. During the Williamite War in Ireland, Everard was a lieutenant in Sir Michael Creagh's Regiment of Infantry. He was attainted in 1691, forfeiting his estate.

References

Year of birth unknown
1720 deaths
17th-century Irish people
Irish Jacobites
Irish MPs 1689
Irish soldiers in the army of James II of England
Members of the Parliament of Ireland (pre-1801) for County Meath constituencies
People convicted under a bill of attainder